Sujata Bhatt (born 6 May 1956) is an Indian poet.

Life and career
Sujata Bhatt was born in Ahmedabad, Gujarat and brought up in Pune until 1968, when she immigrated to United States with her family. She has an MFA from the University of Iowa, and for a time was writer-in-residence at the University of Victoria, Canada. She received the Commonwealth Poetry Prize (Asia) and Alice Hunt Bartlett Prize for her first collection Brunizem in 1987. She received a Cholmondeley Award in 1991 and Italian Tratti Poetry Prize in 2000. She has translated Gujarati poetry into English for the Penguin Anthology of Contemporary Indian Women Poets. Combining Gujarati and English, Bhatt writes "Indian-English rather than Anglo-Indian poetry." Michael Schmidt (poet) observed that her "free verse is fast-moving, urgent with narratives, softly spoken. Bhatt lives in Bremen, Germany with her husband, the German writer Michael Augustin, and daughter.

Poetry collections

1988 Brunizem Carcanet Press
1989 The One Who Goes Away Carcanet Press
1991 Monkey Shadows Carcanet Press
1995 The Stinking Rose Carcanet Press
1997 Point No Point Carcanet Press
2000 Augatora Carcanet Press 
2002 The Colour of Solitude (Second edition) Carcanet Press
2008 Pure Lizard Carcanet Press
---- A Different History

References

External links
Profile and poems written and audio at the Poetry Archive
poems written archived at The Poetry Society UK
British Council profile 
BBC Radio 4. Woman's Hour 4 July 2002 (Audio 5 mins)  

1956 births
Indian women poets
20th-century Indian women writers
English-language poets from India
Living people
Gujarati people
German people of Indian descent
20th-century Indian poets
Poets from Gujarat
Women writers from Gujarat
Writers from Ahmedabad